The following tables show the Andorra national football team's all-time international record. The statistics are composed of FIFA World Cup, UEFA European Football Championship, UEFA Nations League, as well as numerous international friendly tournaments and matches.

Performances
 ''Last match updated was against  on 17 November 2019

Performance by competition

Individual records

Player records

Manager records

Team records

Competition records

FIFA World Cup

Head-to-head record

References

Andorra national football team records and statistics
National association football team records and statistics